Sérgio Assis Capitango Fernando Santos (born 2 October 1998) is a Portuguese professional footballer who plays as a forward for Petro Luanda.

Professional career
Santos made his professional debut with Portimonense in a 2-1 Taça da Liga win over Gil Vicente F.C. on 25 September 2019. Santos moved to Angola with Petro Luanda in August 2021.

Personal life
Born in Portugal, Santos is of Angolan descent.

References

External links
 
 
 Liga Portugal Profile

1998 births
Living people
Footballers from Lisbon
Portuguese footballers
Portuguese sportspeople of Angolan descent
Portimonense S.C. players
F.C. Penafiel players
Campeonato de Portugal (league) players
Girabola players
Association football forwards